Unmasked is a 1950 American crime film directed by George Blair and starring Robert Rockwell, Barbra Fuller and Raymond Burr.

The film's sets were designed by the art director Frank Hotaling.

Plot

Cast
 Robert Rockwell as Detective Lt. James 'Jim' Webster  
 Barbra Fuller as Linda Jackson  
 Raymond Burr as Roger Lewis  
 Hillary Brooke as Doris King Jackson  
 Paul Harvey as Harry Jackson  
 Norman Budd as 'Biggie' Wolfe  
 John Eldredge as Johnny Rocco  
 Emory Parnell as 'Pop' Swenson  
 Russell Hicks as George Richards, District Attorney  
 Grace Albertson as Mona Durant, Lewis' Sweetheart  
 Lester Sharpe as Mr. Schmidt, Pawnbroker  
 Charles Quigley as Newcombe—Police Detective  
 Barbara Pepper as Mrs. Schmidt  
 Charles Trowbridge as Dr. Lowell  
 Harry Harvey as Saunders

References

Bibliography
 Spicer, Andrew. Historical Dictionary of Film Noir. Scarecrow Press, 2010.

External links
 

1950 films
1950 crime films
American crime films
Films directed by George Blair
Republic Pictures films
American black-and-white films
1950s English-language films
1950s American films